Group A of the 2004 Fed Cup Americas Zone Group I was one of two pools in the Americas Zone Group I of the 2004 Fed Cup. Four teams competed in a round robin competition, with the top two teams and the bottom two teams proceeding to their respective sections of the play-offs: the top teams play for advancement to the World Group Play-offs, while the bottom teams face potential relegation to Group II.

Colombia vs. Mexico

El Salvador vs. Puerto Rico

Colombia vs. Puerto Rico

Mexico vs. El Salvador

Colombia vs. El Salvador

Mexico vs. Puerto Rico

See also
Fed Cup structure

References

External links
 Fed Cup website

2004 Fed Cup Americas Zone